Commander Alfred Martyn Williams, CBE, DSC (14 May 1897 – 1 March 1985) was a British naval officer and Conservative MP for North Cornwall.

He won the seat from the Liberals in 1924, but lost it to them in 1929. He unsuccessfully tried to win it back from them at the 1931 general election and a by-election in 1932.

He was also High Sheriff of Cornwall in 1938. He was the father of Hugh Martyn Williams.

Sources
British Parliamentary Election Results 1918–1949, compiled and edited by F.W.S. Craig (Macmillan Press 1977)

Who's Who of British Members of Parliament, Volume III 1919–1945, edited by M. Stenton and S. Lees (Harvester Press 1979)

Who Was Who

 v
 t
 e

Conservative Party (UK) MPs for English constituencies
High Sheriffs of Cornwall
Members of the Parliament of the United Kingdom for North Cornwall
UK MPs 1924–1929
1897 births
1985 deaths
Royal Navy officers of World War I
Royal Navy officers
Commanders of the Order of the British Empire
Recipients of the Distinguished Service Cross (United Kingdom)
Deputy Lieutenants of Cornwall